Whiteface High School is a public high school located in Whiteface, Texas (USA) and classified as a 1A school by the UIL. It is part of the Whiteface Consolidated Independent School District located in far east central Cochran County. Neighboring Pep ISD consolidated in 1978 with Whiteface. In 2015, the school was rated "Met Standard" by the Texas Education Agency.

Athletics
The Whiteface Antelopes compete in the following sports 

Baseball
Basketball
Cross Country
6-Man Football
Golf
Powerlifting
Tennis
Track and Field

State Titles
Girls Basketball 
1997(1A)
One Act Play 
1998(1A)
Marching Band 
2017(1A)

See also
List of Six-man football stadiums in Texas

References

External links
Whiteface ISD

Schools in Cochran County, Texas
Public high schools in Texas
Public middle schools in Texas